Dustin Thomason (born 1976) is an American writer and producer who co-authored the New York Times bestselling historical fiction novel The Rule of Four with Ian Caldwell.

Novels
Thomason began his career as a novelist. He is a co-author of the 2004 novel The Rule of Four, and the author of 12.21. The Rule of Four hit the top of the New York Times Best Seller list, where it remained for six months, sold more than four million copies, and was the best selling debut novel of the decade. 12.21 (concerning the 2012 phenomenon) was also a New York Times and International bestseller. In addition to television, Thomason's production company, Old Curiosity Shop, has published and produced three young adult novels ("Antisocial", "Soul City", "xL").

Television career
Thomason co-created and was showrunner of Hulu's Castle Rock, for which he won the 2019 Writers Guild of America award for long form original television. He also co-created ABC drama The Evidence and wrote and executive produced Fox's Lie to Me and WGN America's critically-acclaimed Manhattan. He is currently the Executive Producer of the David E. Kelley/Apple TV+'s series Presumed Innocent, and the co-creator Overlook, the forthcoming series from JJ Abrams's  of Bad Robot set in the universe of Stephen King's The Shining.

Personal life
Thomason attended Thomas Jefferson High School for Science and Technology in Fairfax County, Virginia, then went on to study anthropology at Harvard University and received his M.D. and his MBA from Columbia University in 2003.  He lives and works in Los Angeles, California.

He was childhood friends with Rule of Four coauthor Ian Caldwell, whom he first collaborated with in elementary school.

References

External links 
 
 "Rule of Four" (2004)
 "12.21"

21st-century American novelists
American male novelists
1976 births
Columbia Business School alumni
Harvard University alumni
People from Fairfax County, Virginia
Writers from Los Angeles
Living people
Thomas Jefferson High School for Science and Technology alumni
Columbia University Vagelos College of Physicians and Surgeons alumni
21st-century American male writers